Operation Geneva Park was a security operation during the Vietnam War in Quảng Ngãi Province, that took place from 18 March 1969 to 28 February 1971.

Background
The operation was conducted by the 198th Light Infantry Brigade, 23rd Infantry Division in cooperation and coordination with the Army of the Republic of Vietnam (ARVN) 6th Regiment, 2nd Division to secure major lines of communications and the destruction of People's Army of Vietnam (PAVN) and Vietcong (VC) units threatening Quảng Ngãi or the Chu Lai Base Area.

Operation

1969
The attack was repulsed with eight PAVN/VC killed and one individual weapon captured, US losses were one killed. The troops engaged the PAVN/VC supported by helicopter gunships and artillery. The PAVN/VC withdrew leaving 27 dead, US losses were four dead.

The PAVN/VC withdrew at nightfall and a search of the battle area found 22 PAVN/VC dead, US losses were one killed.

The PAVN/VC threw hand grenades and the troopers returned fire with automatic weapons supported by artillery forcing them to withdraw. US casualties were one killed. Small arms and automatic weapons fire was exchanged and the fighting continued for two hours before the PAVN/VC withdrew, leaving 12 dead, five individual weapons, two field telephones and 15 hand grenades.

1970
The defenders fired back supported by helicopter gunships. Five PAVN/VC dead were found around the perimeter, while US losses were one killed.
was directed onto the location, resulting in four secondary explosions and the bodies of 19 PAVN/VC were sighted in the strike area.

The PAVN/VC withdrew, leaving seven dead and 11 backpacks in the strike area. A short while later, air cavalry troopers were air-assaulted into the vicinity and received heavy small arms fire from the perimeter of the landing zone. The troopers returned fire with unit weapons and were supported by helicopter gunships and artillery. One secondary explosion was observed as a result of the artillery fire. Contact was lost at about 19:10. Two additional PAVN/VC were killed in the ground contact and two individual weapons were captured.

The infantrymen fired back with unit weapons and were supported by artillery fire. The PAVN/VC withdrew, leaving behind one dead and one individual weapon and one soldier was captured. The infantrymen returned fire with organic weapons and were supported by helicopter gunships and artillery forcing the PAVN/VC to withdraw. The infantrymen returned fire with unit weapons and were supported by artillery forcing the PAVN/VC to withdraw, US losses were two killed.

The troops returned fire supported by helicopter gunships from an element of the 16th Combat Aviation Group. Six PAVN/VC were killed and one captured.

On 3 November Company D, 4th Battalion, 31st Infantry Regiment killed three PAVN and captured two weapons. On 4 November Company B, 1st Battalion, 52nd Infantry Regiment killed three VC and captured one. On 5 November Company D, 5th Battalion, 46th Infantry Regiment killed three VC. On 9 November Company B, 5/46th killed five VC. On the same day Company B, 1/52nd triggered a booby-trap killing three US. On 12 November various contacts resulted in 11 PAVN/VC killed. On 13 November gunships from the 116th Assault Helicopter Company killed eight VC. On 22 November Company D, 1/52nd and the 174th Aviation Company killed 11 VC and captured seven weapons.

Three PAVN/VC were killed by the helicopter gunships and another six during the ground action. The troopers were supported by artillery and contact was lost a short time later. Contact was reestablished at about 06:40 and continued until 09:15. In the two actions 13 PAVN/VC were killed, six captured and six individual weapons were captured, US losses were one killed. On 20 December Company B, 1/52nd killed two VC in a bunker and later another four VC were killed.

1971
On 6 January Company A, 5/46th discovered a weapons cache containing five weapons and later killed one VC and captured another weapon. Company B, 5/46th engaged four VC killing one and Company C, 1/52nd killed one VC. On 7 January Company C, 1/52nd killed one VC and detained one. On 9 January Company C, 1/52nd found six graves and then engaged a VC force killing three. On 11 January a booby-trap killed one soldier from Company B, 5/46th. On the same day a team from Company G, 75th Rangers was ambushed losing one killed and forcing the team to evacuate. On 15 January Company G, 75th Rangers engaged three VC, killing two and capturing two weapons. On 17 January Company A, 1/52nd received M79 grenade fire and then engaged a VC unit killing six and capturing two weapons. Later that day Company C, 1/52nd killed six VC and detained one suspect. On 27 January Company D, 1/52nd killed four PAVN and captured two weapons. On 30 January four PAVN were killed by the Brigade. On 1 February Recon Company, 3/46th came under mortar fire losing five killed. On 3 February the Brigade killed nine PAVN/VC.

Aftermath
The operation terminated on 28 February 1971. US losses were 231 killed while PAVN losses were 2,337 killed and 67 captured.

References

1969 in Vietnam
1970 in Vietnam
1971 in Vietnam
Battles and operations of the Vietnam War
Battles and operations of the Vietnam War in 1969
Battles and operations of the Vietnam War in 1970
Battles and operations of the Vietnam War in 1971
History of Quảng Ngãi province